Tinker, Tailor is a counting game, nursery rhyme and fortune telling song. "Tinker, Tailor" may also refer to:

 Tinker Tailor Soldier Spy, a 1974 spy novel by John le Carré
 Tinker Tailor Soldier Spy (TV series), a 1979 TV adaptation of the novel
 Tinker Tailor Soldier Spy (film), a 2011 film adaptation of the novel
 "Tinker Tailor Soldier Sailor Rich Man Poor Man Beggar Man Thief", a song released on the 2016 album A Moon Shaped Pool by Radiohead

See also 
 Rich Man, Poor Man (disambiguation)